John Edward Mower (September 18, 1815–June 11, 1879) was a member of the Minnesota Territorial Legislature in the 1850s. On March 1, 1856 the second territorial Governor Willis A. Gorman (D) honored him by giving the newly created Mower County his name.

Biography
John was born in New Vineyard, Maine in 1815. His family made the move west and settled in St. Louis, Missouri where he met and married Gratia A. Remick. He and his brother, Martin, moved their families to the area around St. Croix Falls, Wisconsin and established themselves in the lumber business in 1843. In 1845 John floated his family downriver on a raft made from the lumber that he would use to build the second frame building in Stillwater, Minnesota, their new home. The Mower brothers built a house in the style of Greek Revival in Arcola in 1847 and it is now on the National Register of Historic Places. He died on June 11, 1879 and is buried in Fairview Cemetery in Stillwater, Minnesota.

Political career
John Edward Mower was elected to the fifth and sixth Minnesota Territorial Councils and in 1875 he was elected to the Minnesota House of Representatives.

References

1815 births
1879 deaths
People from Franklin County, Maine
People from Stillwater, Minnesota
Businesspeople from Minnesota
Members of the Minnesota Territorial Legislature
Members of the Minnesota House of Representatives
Mower County, Minnesota
19th-century American politicians
19th-century American businesspeople